Torremolinos 73 is a 2003 Spanish-Danish comedy film written and directed by Pablo Berger. It stars Javier Cámara, Candela Peña, and Juan Diego.

Plot

Alfredo López is an exasperated encyclopedia salesman for the Montoya Publishing House and lives with his faithful wife Carmen in 1973 Spain. Carmen and Alfredo are given the opportunity by the Montoya Publishing House to create pornographic films that will be imported into Scandinavian countries under the pretence of being an audiovisual encyclopedia of human reproduction. They have no other choice as Alfredo's encyclopedia sales are practically zero and Carmen loses her job. Unknowingly, Carmen becomes an adult film star in the Northern European countries though they are well-paid for their films. In the meantime Alfredo and Carmen are trying to have a child and Carmen discovers that Alfredo has a sperm count of zero.

Inspired to become a film-maker, Alfredo writes an Ingmar Bergman-inspired feature film titled Torremolinos 73. His boss offers to fund the filming of it with Alfredo as director and Carmen as the female star. Alfredo also gets a Danish film crew to help with production. The main role is offered to Máximo Valverde who refuses it, so the role is offered to Magnus, one of the members of the film crew.

At Carmen's suggestion, Alfredo's boss changes the final scene so that Carmen is to have sex with her male co-star so as to get herself pregnant. Alfredo is upset at first but eventually accepts this and the film ends with the couple having a daughter, and Alfredo beginning a new career as a wedding film director.

Cast

Production 
Torremolinos 73 was produced by Telespan, Estudios Picasso, Nimbus Film, and Mama Films.

Release 
Torremolinos 73 screened at the 6th Málaga Film Festival in April 2003.

Reception
The film has a 71 per cent fresh rating by Rotten Tomatoes.

See also 
 List of Spanish films of 2003

References

External links

2003 films
2000s Spanish-language films
Danish-language films
2003 comedy films
Nimbus Film films
Danish multilingual films
Spanish multilingual films
2003 multilingual films
2000s Spanish films
Telecinco Cinema films
Films set in Spain
Films set in 1973